Rekoa meton, the Meton hairstreak is a butterfly in the family Lycaenidae. It is found from Mexico to Brazil.

References

Butterflies described in 1779
Eumaeini